Finnish-Greek relations are foreign relations between Finland and Greece. Greece was among the first countries to recognize the independence of Finland, on January 5, 1918. Both countries established diplomatic relations in 1920.
Since February 1, 1977, Finland has an embassy in Athens. For a long period Finland was represented in Greece through its embassies either in Bucharest, Rome or Belgrade. Finland also has 7 honorary consulates in Kos, Patras, Pireus, Rhodes, Thessaloniki, Heraklion, and Corfu. Greece has an embassy in Helsinki and 4 honorary consulates in Turku, Kuopio, Oulu, and Rovaniemi.

Both countries are full members of the European Union. Greece is a full member of NATO. Finland is not a full member. Greece has given full support to Finland's membership of the European Union.
Greece supports Finland's NATO membership.
There are 1,681 Greeks living in Finland, and 1,600 Finns living in Greece.

Embassies 
The Embassy of Finland is located in Athens, Greece. The Embassy of Greece is located in Helsinki, Finland.

See also 
 Foreign relations of Finland
 Foreign relations of Greece
 Finns in Greece
 Greeks in Finland 
 Accession of Finland to the European Union

References

External links 
   Finnish embassy in Athens
 Greek Ministry of Foreign Affairs about relations with Finland
  Greek embassy in Helsinki

 
Finland
Greece